Ossett was a railway station serving the town of Ossett, West Yorkshire. The station on the Bradford, Wakefield and Leeds Railway and it opened on 7 April 1867 and closed on 5 September 1964. It had an island platform accessed from a ramp surrounded by goods yards.
After closure the tracks were lifted, and the area has been built over with housing.

References

Former Great Northern Railway stations
Disused railway stations in Wakefield
Railway stations in Great Britain opened in 1867
Railway stations in Great Britain closed in 1964
Beeching closures in England